Montbouy is a commune in the Loiret department in north-central France.

Geography
The Aveyron river flows into the Loing in the commune.

History 

Neolithic artefacts have been found on each side of the Loing river, downstream from Montbouy near Craon.

Many Celtic remains suggest that Montbouy was one of the Boii main towns until 1,500 years B.C.. At that time they came under pressure from the Belgae in the north and the Vascones in the south; consequently they left their territory in the Gâtinais around Montargis between the Loing river and the Rimarde river and, accompanied with some Lingones and Senones they went south to found Bolonia in North Italy. After they left their territory was occupied by the Senones and the Carnutes.

See also
Communes of the Loiret department

Notes

References 

Communes of Loiret